Tyler Charlie Goodrham (born 7 August 2003) is an English professional footballer who plays as a midfielder for Oxford United.

Career
On 12 November 2019, after graduating from Oxford United's academy, Goodrham made his debut for the club in a 4–1 EFL Trophy win against Crawley Town, becoming Oxford's youngest ever player in the process, aged 16 years and 98 days. In September 2021 he had his first senior loan when he joined Southern Football League Premier Division South side Hayes & Yeading United. He was recalled on 18 November after a successful loan spell with Hayes reaching the first round of the FA Cup and the team challenging at the top of the table.

On 16 December 2021, Goodrham joined National League South side Slough Town on a one-month loan deal.

Goodrham made his League One debut for Oxford as a late substitute against Cambridge United on 6 August 2022 and scored the winning goal in injury time.

Career statistics

References

2003 births
Living people
Association football midfielders
English footballers
Oxford United F.C. players
Hayes & Yeading United F.C. players
Slough Town F.C. players
National League (English football) players
Southern Football League players
People from High Wycombe